The Kondraty Bulavin house, or Bulavin house is a historical building located not far from the main square of Starocherkasskaya, almost opposite the Peter and Paul Church.

History 
The house is reputed to have been the place where Kondraty Bulavin, the leader of the Bulavin Rebellion, a peasant war between 1707-1709 lived and died. The house was not Bulavin's property, but was requisitioned by him in 1708 after his  capture of Cherkassk and his proclamation as ataman.

The house is an example of stone residential architecture of the first half of the 18th century. The building is square, the walls are about a meter thick, there are vaulted ceilings, lattice windows, and metal doors. These are the signs of a fortified house.

Since the October Revolution in 1917, the building has gradually fallen into disrepair. Annexes were built which distorted the original appearance. But the model used was not the original form, but from a later type dating from the middle of the 19th century.

During Bulavin's time, between the 17th and 18th centuries, the house did not have an external staircase and a porch on the second floor, nor did it have an metal structure along the outside of the second floor. These extensions along the facade would have assisted attackers during a siege of the fortress house. At that time, the walls were flat without any outbuildings, and an internal staircase was used to move from one floor to another.

Nowadays there are museum expositions in the building.

References 

Tourist attractions in Rostov Oblast
Buildings and structures in Rostov Oblast
Museums in Rostov Oblast
Cultural heritage monuments of federal significance in Rostov Oblast